The 2021–22 CAF Champions League qualifying rounds were played from 10 September to 24 October 2021. A total of 54 teams competed in the qualifying rounds to decide the 16 places in the group stage of the 2021–22 CAF Champions League.

Times are in local times.

Draw

The draw for the qualifying rounds was held on 13 August 2021 at the CAF headquarters in Cairo, Egypt.

The entry round of the 54 teams entered into the draw was determined by their performances in the CAF competitions for the previous five seasons (CAF 5-Year Ranking points shown in parentheses).

Format

In the qualifying rounds, each tie was played on a home-and-away two-legged basis. If the aggregate score is tied after the second leg, the away goals rule was applied, and if still tied, extra time won't be played, and the penalty shoot-out was used to determine the winner (Regulations III. 13 & 14).

Schedule
The schedule of the competition was as follows.

Bracket
The bracket of the draw was announced by the CAF on 13 August 2021.

The 16 winners of the second round advanced to the group stage, while the 16 losers of the second round entered the Confederation Cup play-off round.

First round
The first round, also called the first preliminary round, included the 44 teams that did not receive byes to the second round.

||colspan="2" 

|}

LPRC Oilers won 3–2 on aggregate.

Stade Malien won 4–0 on aggregate.

USGN won 2–1 on aggregate.

Al Ittihad won 4–0 on aggregate.

Tusker won 4–1 on aggregate.

APR won 2–1 on aggregate.

AS Maniema Union won 3–1 on aggregate.

AmaZulu won 3–2 on aggregate.

Jwaneng Galaxy won 2–1 on aggregate.

Rivers United won 2–0 on aggregate.

3–3 on aggregate. Al Hilal won on away goals.

ASEC Mimosas won 2–0 on aggregate.

CR Belouizdad won 2–1 on aggregate.

1–1 on aggregate. AS Otohô won 4–3 on penalties.

2–2 on aggregate. Petro de Luanda won on away goals.

FC Nouadhibou won 3–1 on aggregate.

3–3 on aggregate. ES Sétif won 5–4 on penalties.

0–0 on aggregate. Sagrada Esperança won 5–4 on penalties.

2–2 on aggregate. Royal Leopards won on away goals.

2–2 on aggregate. Al Merrikh won on away goals.

Zanaco won 3–0 on aggregate.

Second round
The second round, also called the second preliminary round, included 32 teams: the 10 teams that received byes to this round, and the 22 winners of the first round.

 

Wydad AC won 6–2 on aggregate.

Raja Casablanca won 4–0 on aggregate.

Horoya won 3–1 on aggregate.

Al Ahly won 7–2 on aggregate.

Espérance de Tunis won 1–0 on aggregate.

Zamalek won 5–0 on aggregate.

Étoile du Sahel won 5–1 on aggregate.

Mamelodi Sundowns won 4–2 on aggregate.

1–1 on aggregate. AmaZulu won on away goals.

3–3 on aggregate. Jwaneng Galaxy won on away goals.

Al Hilal won 2–1 on aggregate.

3–3 on aggregate. CR Belouizdad won on away goals.

Petro de Luanda won 4–2 on aggregate.

3–3 on aggregate. ES Sétif won on away goals.

Sagrada Esperança won 3–2 on aggregate.

Al Merrikh won 4–2 on aggregate.

Notes

References

External links
Total CAF Champions League, CAFonline.com

1
September 2021 sports events in Africa
October 2021 sports events in Africa